In the mathematical discipline of matrix theory, a Jordan matrix, named after Camille Jordan, is a block diagonal matrix over a ring  (whose identities are the zero 0 and one 1), where each block along the diagonal, called a Jordan block, has the following form:

Definition

Any block diagonal matrix whose blocks are Jordan blocks is called a Jordan matrix.

For example, the matrix

is a  Jordan matrix with a  block with eigenvalue , two  blocks with eigenvalue the imaginary unit , and a  block with eigenvalue 7.

Linear algebra 
A diagonalizable matrix is similar, in fact, to a special case of Jordan matrix: the matrix whose blocks are all .

Note that knowing a matrix's spectrum with all of its algebraic/geometric multiplicities and indexes does not always allow for the computation of its Jordan normal form (this may be a sufficient condition only for spectrally simple, usually low-dimensional matrices): the Jordan decomposition is, in general, a computationally challenging task. From the vector space point of view, the Jordan decomposition is equivalent to finding an orthogonal decomposition (that is, via direct sums of eigenspaces represented by Jordan blocks) of the domain which the associated generalized eigenvectors make a basis for.

Functions of matrices 
Let

The matrix  is then defined via the following formal power series

The Jordan normal form allows the computation of functions of matrices without explicitly computing an infinite series, which is one of the main achievements of Jordan matrices. Using the facts that the th power of a diagonal block matrix is the diagonal block matrix whose blocks are the th powers of the respective blocks; that is,  and that , the above matrix power series becomes

where the last series need not be computed explicitly via power series of every Jordan block. In fact, if , any holomorphic function of a Jordan block  has a finite power series around  because . Thus it is the following upper triangular matrix:

As a consequence of this, the computation of any function of a matrix is straightforward whenever its Jordan normal form and its change-of-basis matrix are known.

Also, ; that is, every eigenvalue  corresponds to the eigenvalue , but it has, in general, different algebraic multiplicity, geometric multiplicity and index. However, the algebraic multiplicity may be computed as follows:

The function  of a linear transformation  between vector spaces can be defined in a similar way according to the holomorphic functional calculus, where Banach space and Riemann surface theories play a fundamental role. In the case of finite-dimensional spaces, both theories perfectly match.

Dynamical systems 
Now suppose a (complex) dynamical system is simply defined by the equation

where  is the (-dimensional) curve parametrization of an orbit on the Riemann surface  of the dynamical system, whereas  is an  complex matrix whose elements are complex functions of a -dimensional parameter .

Such changes mean that several Jordan blocks (either belonging to different eigenvalues or not) join to a unique Jordan block, or vice versa (that is, one Jordan block splits into two or more different ones). Many aspects of bifurcation theory for both continuous and discrete dynamical systems can be interpreted with the analysis of functional Jordan matrices.

From the tangent space dynamics, this means that the orthogonal decomposition of the dynamical system's phase space changes and, for example, different orbits gain periodicity, or lose it, or shift from a certain kind of periodicity to another (such as period-doubling, cfr. logistic map).

Linear ordinary differential equations 
The simplest example of a dynamical system is a system of linear, constant-coefficient, ordinary differential equations; that is, let  and :

whose direct closed-form solution involves computation of the matrix exponential:

Another way, provided the solution is restricted to the local Lebesgue space of -dimensional vector fields , is to use its Laplace transform . In this case

The matrix function  is called the resolvent matrix of the differential operator .

See also 
 Jordan decomposition
 Jordan normal form
 Holomorphic functional calculus
 Matrix exponential
 Logarithm of a matrix
 Dynamical system
 Bifurcation theory
 State space (controls)

Notes

References
 
 
 

Matrix theory
Matrix normal forms